Đào Nguyên Cát (born 1927) is a Vietnamese economist, professor and journalist. He is the founding and current editor-in-chief of The Vietnam Economic Times, one of the country's oldest and most influential economics and business publications. He played a prominent role during Vietnam's Đổi Mới economic reform, and served as the Chairman of the Vietnam Economic Association. Professor Cát was awarded the Resistance Medal (2nd Class Honor) by the Government of Vietnam.

Reference 

Vietnamese economists